It was a Dacian fortified town.

References

External links
Picasa - Photos by Andrei Adomnicăi

Dacian fortresses in Ialomița County
Historic monuments in Ialomița County